C. Nagabushanam  (19 April 1921 – 5 May 1995) was an Indian actor known for his works in Telugu cinema and Telugu theatre. He acted in more than 350 films from the 1950s to the 1980s. He primarily acted in villain and character actor roles. Nagabushanam was a trendsetter in enacting comic villain characters. He was also known by the title “Natabhooshana”.

He acted in with more than 5000 shows of the play Raktha Kanneeru due to which he also became known as “Raktha Kanneeru Nagabhushanam”. His first film was Palletooru (1952). He also played the lead role in the 1956 film Edi Nijam which won the Certificate of Merit at the 4th National Film Awards. His other notable films include Mayabazar (1957), Mosagallaku Mosagadu (1971), Mohammad bin Tughlaq (1972), Ida Lokam (1973), Andala Ramudu (1973), and Kurukshetram (1977).

Nagabushanam also produced a handful of films, including Natakala Rayudu (1969) and Oke Kutumbam (1970). He died on 5 May 1995.

Personal life
Chundi Nagabhushanam was born into a Telugu speaking family in Nellore, Andhra Pradesh. He did odd jobs before he joined the railways and later the film industry. Nagabhushanam had three sons and two daughters and seven grand children. None of them are into film industry.

Filmography

References

External links
 

Telugu male actors
1920s births
1995 deaths
Telugu comedians
Indian male comedians
20th-century Indian male actors
Indian male film actors
Male actors in Telugu cinema
20th-century comedians